Abraham Elieser Adolph Schönberg (May 12, 1868 – August 12, 1949), known as Al Shean, was a comedian and vaudeville performer. Other sources give his birth name variously as Adolf Schönberg, Albert Schönberg, or Alfred Schönberg. He is most remembered for being half of the vaudeville team Gallagher and Shean, and as the uncle of the Marx Brothers (Leonard Joseph "Chico" Marx, Adolph (Arthur) "Harpo" Marx, Julius Henry "Groucho" Marx, Milton "Gummo" Marx and Herbert Manfred "Zeppo" Marx).

Biography

Shean was born in Dornum, Germany, on May 12, 1868, the son of Fanny and Levi or Louis Schoenberg. His father was a magician. His sister, Minnie, married Sam "Frenchie" Marx; their sons would become known as the Marx Brothers.

After making a name for himself in vaudeville, Shean teamed up with Edward Gallagher to create the act Gallagher and Shean. While the act was successful, the men apparently did not like each other much. After their act's final Ziegfeld Follies pairing, Shean went on to perform solo in eight Broadway shows, even playing the title character in Father Malachy's Miracle.

Shean had some solo film roles: as the piano player, known as "The Professor" in San Francisco (1936), as a priest in Hitler's Madman (1943), as grandfather in The Blue Bird (1940), and in some three dozen other films. He and Gallagher also made an early sound film at the Theodore Case studio in Auburn, New York, in 1925.

He died on August 12, 1949.

Legacy
Shean's son, also named Al Shean, worked on The Rocky and Bullwinkle Show.

Shean is reputed to have written the Marx Brothers' first (moderately) successful vaudeville sketch on butcher paper at Minnie and Frenchie's kitchen table one night while he was visiting.

Filmography

See also
Gallagher and Shean

References

External links

 Gallagher and Shean (1925) experimental sound film made by Theodore Case
1918 passport photo, Al Shean

1868 births
1949 deaths
People from Aurich (district)
American male comedians
Comedians from New York City
Jewish emigrants from Nazi Germany to the United States
Jewish American male actors
Vaudeville performers
20th-century American male actors
Jewish American comedians
20th-century American comedians